Merton College, Oxford is one of the colleges of the University of Oxford, England.

Merton College may also refer to:

 Merton College, London, part of South Thames College, London, England
 Merton College (Mauritius), a secondary school in Mauritius